The chestnut-backed antbird (Poliocrania exsul) is a passerine bird in the antbird family. It is found in humid forests in Central and South America (Chocó-Magdalena), ranging from eastern Nicaragua to western Ecuador. It mainly occurs in lowlands up to an altitude of  m, but locally it occurs higher.

This is a common bird in the understory thickets of wet forest, especially at edges, along streams and in old treefall clearings, and in adjacent tall second growth.  The female lays two purple or red-brown spotted white eggs, which are incubated by both sexes, in an untidy cup nest which is constructed from vines, plant fibre and dead leaves and placed low in vegetation. The male and female parents both feed the chicks.

Taxonomy
The chestnut-backed antbird was described by the English zoologist Philip Sclater in 1859 and given the binomial name Myrmeciza exsul. A molecular phylogenetic study published in 2013 found that the genus Myrmeciza, as then defined, was polyphyletic. In the resulting rearrangement to create monophyletic genera the chestnut-backed antbird was moved to a newly erected genus Poliocrania. The name of the new genus combines the Ancient Greek words polios "ash-gray" and kranion "head" or "skull". The genus is monospecific.

There are five subspecies:
 P. e. exsul (Sclater, PL, 1859) – east Nicaragua to west Panama
 P. e. occidentalis (Cherrie, 1891) – west Costa Rica and south Panama
 P. e. cassini (Ridgway, 1908) – southeast Panama and north Colombia
 P. e. niglarus (Wetmore, 1962) – east Panama and northwest Colombia
 P. e. maculifer (Hellmayr, 1906) – west Colombia and west Ecuador

Description

Both sexes have a pale blue bare patch of skin around each eye. The adult male has a blackish head, neck and breast, and the rest of the upperparts, wings and tail are chestnut. The flanks and the lower belly are a somewhat darker brown. The female has a brownish-black head and neck, but this does not extend to the breast. Her underparts are a darker chestnut in the nominate subspecies of the Caribbean lowlands from Nicaragua to Panama, but more rufous in M. e. occidentalis of the Pacific lowlands in Costa Rica and Panama. M. e. niglarus from eastern Panama and far north-western Colombia (northern Chocó Department) is similar. Young birds are duller and slatier than the adults.

The subspecies found in far south-east Panama (Darién Province), Colombia (except northern Chocó Department) and Ecuador, P. e. maculifer and P. e. cassini, have two wing bars consisting of white spots. They were once considered a separate species, the wing-spotted antbird (P. maculifer), but are vocally similar to the subspecies without spots on the wings, and the two groups hybridize where their distributions come into contact.

This species has a grating naar call, and the male's song is a whistled peeet peeew answered by the female's higher pitched version.

The chestnut-backed antbird is normally found as pairs throughout the year, but occasionally joins  mixed-species feeding flocks or army ants. It feeds on insects, other arthropods, and sometimes small frogs or lizards taken from leaf litter and vine tangles in low vegetation or on the ground.  It is easier to hear than see in its dense habitat, but can be attracted by imitating its whistled song. It may then give a territorial display with puffed-up body, drooped wings, and pumping tail.

References

Further reading

External links

chestnut-backed antbird
Birds of Nicaragua
Birds of Costa Rica
Birds of Panama
chestnut-backed antbird
chestnut-backed antbird